TAKE ONE is a British online film magazine published in Cambridge. It was founded in 2011 as the official magazine of Cambridge Film Festival, covering general release of independent and arthouse cinema and films from various film festivals, publishing reviews and interviews with directors and other people associated with those films. At festivals, hard copies of the magazine are also often printed and circulated. It additionally offers "full, comprehensive coverage" of Cambridge Film Festival.

Since 2017, TAKE ONE has sent students of Anglia Ruskin University to Cannes Film Festival to complete coverage of the festival as part of their coursework, with this scheme expanding to Edinburgh International Film Festival in 2019. Since 2018, TAKE ONE have been official media partners of the Edinburgh Short Film Festival.

TAKE ONE Awards
Every year, TAKE ONE hand out the 'TAKE ONE Awards' in various categories.

References

External links

Film magazines published in the United Kingdom
Online magazines published in the United Kingdom
Magazines established in 2011
Mass media in Cambridge